Rheinbach Römerkanal station is a railway station in the eastern part of the municipality of Rheinbach, located in the Rhein-Sieg-Kreis district in North Rhine-Westphalia, Germany.

References

Railway stations in North Rhine-Westphalia
Buildings and structures in Rhein-Sieg-Kreis
Railway stations in Germany opened in 2013